is a city located in Aomori Prefecture, Japan. , the city had an estimated population of 30,086 in 14,181 households, and a population density of 89 persons per km2.

Geography
Hirakawa is located in the mountains and hills to the northwest of Lake Towada. The Iwaki River flows through the city. Part of the city is within the borders of the Kuroishi Onsenkyō Prefectural Natural Park.

Neighbouring municipalities 
Aomori Prefecture
Aomori
Hirosaki
Kuroishi
Towada
Inakadate
Owani
Akita Prefecture
Ōdate
Kosaka

Climate
The city has a cold humid continental climate (Köppen Dfa) characterized by warm short summers and long cold winters with heavy snowfall. The average annual temperature in Hirasawa is 8.8 °C. The average annual rainfall is 1413 mm with September as the wettest month. The temperatures are highest on average in August, at around 22.5 °C, and lowest in January, at around -3.8 °C.

History
The area around Hirakawa was part of the Hirosaki Domain of the Tsugaru clan during the Edo period. After the Meiji Restoration, with the establishment of the modern municipalities system on April 1, 1889, it became part of Minamitsugaru District, Aomori. The village of Onoe was raised to town status on April 1, 1937. The city of Hirakawa was established on January 1, 2006, from the merger of the towns of Hiraka and Onoe, and the village of Ikarigaseki.

Demographics
Per Japanese census data, the population of Hirakawa has decreased steadily over the past 60 years.

Government

Hirakawa has a mayor-council form of government with a directly elected mayor and a unicameral city legislature of 16 members. The city elects two members to the Aomori Prefectural Assembly.  In terms of national politics, the city is part of Aomori 3rd district of the lower house of the Diet of Japan.

Economy
The economy of Hirakawa is primarily agricultural, with rice and apples as the predominant crops. The city government is encouraging the development of highland vegetables and a local brand of beef.

Education
Hirakawa has nine public elementary schools and four public junior high schools operated by the city government, and two public high schools operated by the Aomori Prefectural Board of Education.

Transportation

Railway
 East Japan Railway Company (JR East) - Ōu Main Line
 , 
  Kōnan Railway Company - Kōnan Railway Kōnan Line

Highway

Local attractions
 Saruka Jinja
 Seitō Shoin Teien, National Place of Scenic Beauty
 Seibi-en, National Place of Scenic Beauty 
Kuroishi Onsenkyō Prefectural Natural Park
Nurukawa onsen
Ikarigaseki onsen
Hisayoshi Dam

References

External links 

 

 
Cities in Aomori Prefecture